The Coacoachou River is a river in the Côte-Nord region of Quebec, Canada.

Location

It includes parts of the unorganized territory of Petit-Mécatina and the municipality of Côte-Nord-du-Golfe-du-Saint-Laurent.
The mouth of the river is in the municipality of Côte-Nord-du-Golfe-du-Saint-Laurent in Le Golfe-du-Saint-Laurent Regional County Municipality.

The bay is the only harbor on this part of the coast for mid-sized ships, but the many shoals and rocks make the entrance difficult.
However, according to the Dictionnaire des rivières et lacs de la province de Québec (1914),

Name

The Innu of the region used the river to access their hunting grounds, and called it Natistagoua, or "Caribou River".
In 1694 Louis Jolliet stopped in the "Natistagoua Harbor", and this name appears on a map from 1784.
Thomas Wright uses "Natistagoet Harbour" on a 1790 map.
The Innu language term koakoachu or coacoacho means "wolverine" or "savage devil", a greedy, cunning and carnivorous animal.
The name Coacoachou appears in 1833 on a map by Bayfield to designate the bay.

Fishing

Initially the Innu people of the region used the rivers freely as highways and sources of fish.
By 1845, suffering from famine, they began to lay claim to the rivers.
The "salmon war"[fr] of 1981–1983 mostly concerned four rivers, the Moisie, Natashquan, Coacoachou and Olomane.
Private ownership of most but not all rivers was removed as a result.

In 2017 all salmon, large and small, had to be released on the Malbaie (Gaspé Peninsula), Pigou, Bouleau, Magpie, Coacoachou, Nétagamiou, Little Mécatina and Véco rivers. 
Only young salmon could be retained on 51 rivers, and limited retention of large salmon was allowed on 19 rivers.

Notes

Sources

Rivers of Côte-Nord